Panagiotis Deligiannidis (born 29 August 1996) is a Greek professional footballer who plays as a defender for Super League 2 club Panserraikos.

Career

On 23 February 2016, Deligiannidis joined Slovak club Zemplín Michalovce on a six-months loan deal, until the end of the 2015–16 season.

Career statistics

Club

Honours
PAOK
Greek Cup: 2016–17, 2017–18

References

External links

PAOKFC

1996 births
Living people
Greek footballers
Greece under-21 international footballers
Greece youth international footballers
Greek expatriate footballers
Super League Greece players
PAOK FC players
MFK Zemplín Michalovce players
OFI Crete F.C. players
Liga I players
Sepsi OSK Sfântu Gheorghe players
Expatriate footballers in Slovakia
Greek expatriate sportspeople in Slovakia
Expatriate footballers in Romania
Greek expatriate sportspeople in Romania
Association football defenders
Association football midfielders
Footballers from Thessaloniki